Andrea Carlo Ferrari (born 1972) earned a PhD in electrical engineering from the University of Cambridge after obtaining a Laurea in nuclear engineering at Polytechnic University of Milan, in Italy. He was also awarded an ScD (Doctor of Science) from the University of Cambridge. He is the Founder and Director of the Cambridge Graphene Centre at the University of Cambridge, and the EPSRC Doctoral Training Centre in Graphene Technology. Prof. Ferrari is the Science and Technology Officer and the Chair of the Management Panel of the Graphene Flagship, one of the biggest research initiatives ever funded by the European Commission.

Awards
Ferrari is a Fellow of the American Physical Society, the Institute of Physics, the Materials Research Society, the Optical Society, the European Academy of Sciences, the Royal Academy of Engineering, and the Royal Society of Chemistry. He is also a Member of Academia Europaea. Among others, he has received the following awards:

Royal Society Wolfson Research Merit Award 
Royal Society Mercer Award for Innovation
Marie Curie Excellence Award
Philip Leverhulme Prize
EU-40 Materials Prize.

Ferrari has also received 4 European Research Council grants.

Ferrari's papers have been cited over 140,000 times yielding a h-index of 126. He has been included on a number of highly cited researchers lists including the list of scientists with h-index beyond 100.

Research

Ferrari is a leading researcher in graphene and related materials, having pioneered bulk production, mass scale identification by optical and spectroscopic means, implementation in composites, printed and flexible electronics,
lasers,  modulators,
detectors, and many others. He also gave seminal contributions to the growth, characterization and modelling of diamond and diamond-like carbon, amorphous, disordered and nanostructured carbons, carbon nanotubes, and nanowires.
He investigated their applications for coating, optoelectronics and sensing. He worked on non-linear optical properties of carbon nanotubes for photonic devices, and on layered materials for single photon emission and quantum technology applications.

References

External links

1972 births
Living people
Alumni of the University of Cambridge
Polytechnic University of Milan alumni
Fellows of the American Physical Society
Place of birth missing (living people)
Engineering professors at the University of Cambridge